Victorine may refer to:

People
 Victorine Q. Adams (1912–2006), first African-American woman to serve on the Baltimore City Council
 Tory Dent (1958–2005), American poet, art critic and commentator on AIDS
 Victorine Foot (1920–2000), British painter
 Victorine Goddard (1844–1935), New Zealand homemaker and hotel-keeper
 Victorine du Pont Homsey (1900–1998), American architect
 Victorine Meurent (1844–1927), French model and painter
 Victorine Gboko Wodié, Ivorian lawyer, magistrate and politician
 Sasha Victorine (born 1978), American soccer player
 Victorines, a group of philosophers and mystics based at the School of Saint Victor
 Victorines, monks attached to the Abbey of St Victor, Marseille and its daughter houses

Other uses
 Victorine (ship), missing Australian schooner
 , also known as USS Victorine (SP-951), a fishing trawler used in World War I as a patrol craft
 Victorine Studios a French film studio located in Nice

See also
Louise-Victorine Ackermann (1813–1890), French poet